William Eccles (1794 – 17 June 1853) was a British Radical politician.

Eccles was elected Radical MP for Blackburn at the 1852 general election but was unseated shortly in 1853 due to bribery. He died just a few months later.

References

External links
 

UK MPs 1852–1857
1794 births
1853 deaths
Members of the Parliament of the United Kingdom for English constituencies